Calothamnus pachystachyus  is a plant in the myrtle family, Myrtaceae and is endemic to the south-west of Western Australia. It is an erect, much-branched shrub with thick bark, flat leaves and clusters of red flowers in spring. (In 2014 Craven, Edwards and Cowley proposed that the species be renamed Melaleuca pachystachya.)

Description
The bark is thick, corky and densely hairy.

The flowers are red, black and brown and the hypanthium is buried in the corky bark at flowering time. There are 4 petals and the stamens are arranged in 4 claw-like bundles, the upper two broad and flat and the lower ones narrow and lacking anthers. Each stamen bundle contains 15 to 20 or more individual stamens. Flowering occurs between August and October and is followed by fruits which are woody capsules partly buried in the bark.

Taxonomy and naming
Calothamnus pachystachyus was first formally described in 1867 by George Bentham in Flora Australiensis. The specific epithet (pachystachyus) is from the Ancient Greek words pakhús meaning "thick" and stachys meaning "a spike".

Distribution and habitat
Calothamnus pachystachyus occurs near the boundary between the Avon Wheatbelt, Jarrah Forest and Swan Coastal Plain biogeographic regions where it grows soils derived from laterite on ridges and roadsides.

Conservation
Calothamnus pachystachyus is classified as "Priority Four" by the Western Australian government Department of Parks and Wildlife meaning that is rare or near threatened.

References

pachystachyus
Endemic flora of Western Australia
Myrtales of Australia
Plants described in 1867
Taxa named by George Bentham